Low End Theory was a weekly experimental hip hop and electronic music club night that took place every Wednesday from 2006 to 2018 at The Airliner in Lincoln Heights, Los Angeles, California.

History
"The Low End Theory" is the second studio album by American hip hop group A Tribe Called Quest, released on September 24, 1991, by Jive Records. The music venue Low End Theory was founded in 2006 by producer and Alpha Pup Records label head Daddy Kev. As the "epicenter" of L.A.'s instrumental hip hop scene, Low End Theory has become one of the most influential venues for the 'beat music' genre. Long-time resident DJs include Daddy Kev, The Gaslamp Killer, Nobody, and D-Styles.

"L.A.'s monolithic weekly showcase for uncut beat-driven tracks" has been a launchpad for the success of prolific electronic artists such as The Glitch Mob, Daedelus, Nosaj Thing and Flying Lotus, who describes the club's humble beginnings as a sort of "producer's lounge". The club night "showcases the links between classic Los Angeles rap and the fractured jazz of Eric Dolphy but also demonstrates how artists are using dazzling instrument technologies to upend both of those traditions".

Low End Theory has garnered much attention after multiple performances by Thom Yorke, who played for the normal price of ten dollars. "If tickets were left to auction online, they'd bring in enough to fund a state Senate campaign".

In 2014, The First Low End Theory Festival was Held at the Echoplex in Los Angeles. The First Festivals Lineup Included The Internet, Invisibl Skratch Piklz, Nosaj Thing, Baths, Daedelus, Teebs, Jonwayne, Knxwledge, Ras G, Dntl, Dibiase, Mono/Poly, House Shoes, Kamasi Washington, Anderson Paak, Matthewdavid, Elos, Astronautica, and milo along with residents Daddy Kev, Dj Nobody, D Styles, Gaslamp Killer, and Nocando.

The monthly Low End Theory Podcast began in 2009 and features mixes from a resident DJ and one guest DJ. Since its inception, Low End Theory has expanded to Japan, San Francisco, New York City, and Europe, performing quarterly in Japan and every now and again in the latter three.

Closure 
The final Low End Theory show occurred on August 8, 2018.

References

External links

Music venues in Los Angeles
Nightclubs in Los Angeles County, California
Lincoln Heights, Los Angeles
Music venues completed in 2009
2009 establishments in California